Bell Baxter High School is a non-denominational comprehensive school for 11 to 18-year-olds in Cupar, Fife, Scotland. Founded in 1889, it educates over 1,500 pupils mainly from the surrounding villages. 

The school is one of 18 secondary schools under the authority of Fife Council, and is led by rector Lynn Black with the support of a senior leadership team. Bell Baxter takes its name from donors Dr Andrew Bell, creator of the Madras system, and businessman Sir David Baxter. The school's history can be traced back to institutions dating from around 1635.

School history
Originally Bell-Baxter School, Bell Baxter High School was founded in 1889 when the Rev. Dr Andrew Bell's Madras Academy combined with Sir David Baxter's Institute for Young Ladies, taking the name of its joint founders.  

The earliest roots of Bell Baxter can be traced back to around 1635, in the form of the Grammar School of Cupar. The school became Cupar Academy in 1727 after some reorganisation, and remained as such until 1831 when an endowment from Dr Bell led to the adoption of the name Madras Academy. Madras Academy was one of two schools left money by Dr Bell in the North East Fife area which adopted his Madras system, the other being Madras College in his home town of St Andrews. 

Originally, secondary education was to be delivered at the former Institute for Young Ladies' Westport building, and elementary education from the former Madras Academy's Castlehill site. The oldest part of the Westport building was first used in 1890, with the rest of the building being built in 1929.

However, the school quickly outgrew these premises, and in 1959 a new building was commissioned on Carslogie Road under a 5-year Fife school-building programme. During the interim period, a number of wooden huts were utilised as classrooms due to the large amount of pupils. By 1962, the new building had opened to senior pupils, resulting in a three-quarters of a mile commute for some teachers and pupils between the two sites.

As a result of continuous renovation work which drastically extended and transformed the building, the school was able to be consolidated at the Carslogie Road site in 2010. The Westport Road building has since been demolished, with 30 affordable homes and a business centre constructed on the site. Only the facade of the main building remains along with St Michael's Church adjacent to the school.

Coat of Arms 
The school's coat of arms features, at the top of the shield, the Thane of Fife to represent Fife Council's control of the school. This is accompanied below by the three Myrtle Crowns of Cupar on the left, and a coat representing Bell and Baxter on the right. In a scroll over this, the school's motto - "Ad Vitam Paror".

Management
From 2007 to 2018, the rector of the school was Philip Black, who then embarked on a secondment to Fife Council which later became a full time job and led to his retirement. Subsequently, the acting rector became Elizabeth Smart, head of Waid Academy, who took lead until Carol Ann Penrose - former head of Lochgelly High School - was appointed as the new rector of Bell Baxter High School. On 11 November 2021, Penrose unexpectedly resigned and Smart was once again appointed acting rector while also leading Waid Academy until a new permanent rector was found.

A new rector was due to be appointed for the start of 2022, however this was later postponed and it was not until the end of the school year in June before it was announced that Beeslack High School head Lynn Black would take over permanently after an interim period under Craig Parnham, a depute rector at Woodmill High School.

Rectors

Notable former pupils  

 Sir Alasdair Breckenridge CBE, Fellow of the Royal College of Physicians both of London and of Edinburgh, a Fellow of the Royal Society of Edinburgh and a founding Fellow of the Academy of Medical Sciences.
 The Very Reverend Professor Robert Craig CBE former Moderator of the Church of Scotland 
 The Reverend Professor Robert Davidson former Moderator of the Church of Scotland 
 Chris Fusaro, Scotland rugby international, winner of the 2007 Schools Cup for Bell Baxter
 William Heggie, first-class cricketer
 George Horne, Scotland rugby international
 Peter Horne, Scotland rugby international, winner of the 2007 Schools Cup for Bell Baxter
 Stevie May, Scottish football international, SFWA Young Player of the Year 2013/14 and currently at St Johnstone FC.
 Rab Noakes, a Scottish singer-songwriter.
 Karen Petrie, academic from the University of Dundee and inventor of the Petrie Multiplier.
 The Proclaimers, Scottish folk-rock musicians
 Sir Bob Reid, former Chief Executive of Shell and Chairman of the British Railways Board from 1990 until 1995
 Dale Reid OBE, one of the most successful golfers in the history of the Ladies European Tour.
 Willie Rennie, MSP and former leader of the Scottish Liberal Democrats
 Sir Robert Robertson, chemist
 David Rollo, former Scotland rugby player.
 Allan Stewart (politician), MP and Scottish Office Minister.
 Stewart Stevenson, SNP MSP for Banffshire and Buchan Coast and previously Minister for Environment and Climate Change in the Scottish Government.
 Sir Garnet Wilson, politician and Lord Provost of Dundee

References

External links
Bell Baxter High School's Website
HMIE inspection
Bell Baxter's page on Scottish Schools Online

Educational institutions established in 1889
Secondary schools in Fife
1889 establishments in Scotland